An auto race is a race involving automobiles.

Auto Race may also refer to:

 Auto Race (Japanese sport), a Japanese version of motorcycle speedway
 Auto Race (ride), an amusement park ride
 Mattel Auto Race, the first handheld video game